Franz Semper (born 5 July 1997) is a German handball player for SG Flensburg-Handewitt and the German national team.

He participated at the 2019 World Men's Handball Championship.

References

1997 births
Living people
German male handball players
People from Borna
Handball-Bundesliga players
Sportspeople from Saxony